William Henry Thorne (September 12, 1844 – July 8, 1923) was a Canadian businessman and politician.

Born in Saint John, New Brunswick, the son E. L. and Susan (Scovil) Thorne, Thorne was educated at Saint John schools, Rev. Charles Lee's Private School and Grammar School. A businessman, he was president of the Thorne Wharf and Warehousing Co., Ltd. He was a director of the Royal Bank of Canada and The Eastern Trust Company. He was president of the Saint John Board of Trade for two years. He was called to the Senate of Canada for the senatorial division of Saint John, New Brunswick, on the advice of Conservative Prime Minister Robert Borden in 1913. He served until his death in 1923.

References
 
 

1844 births
1923 deaths
Canadian businesspeople
Canadian senators from New Brunswick
Conservative Party of Canada (1867–1942) senators